Jürg Bamert (born 10 September 1982) is a Swiss curler.

At the national level, he is a 2012 Swiss men's champion curler.

Teams

References

External links

Living people
1982 births
Sportspeople from Bern
Swiss male curlers
Swiss curling champions